When a Girl Loves is a 1924 American silent drama film directed by Victor Halperin and starring Agnes Ayres, Percy Marmont, and Robert McKim.

Plot
As described in a film magazine review, the Russian Revolution reduces the Boroff family to poverty. Sasha Boroff, in love with Count Michael, is saved from a forced marriage to Rogojin by the latter's sudden death. The Boroff's immigrate to the United States, where Sasha agrees to wed the wealthy Dr. Godfrey Luke. At a concert she recognizes Michael when she hears him sing, he having been reported dead. However, he is married. A love affair between Dr. Luke and Michael's wife results in a shooting affray between the ex-Count and Luke. They miss each other, but Sasha is wounded in the arm. The shock leaves Michael prostrated. He is restored to health by Sasha's dwarf friend, Grishka, who has discovered a cure with radio-vibration. In a vague ending, although Michael has been brought back to life by the radio invention of Grishka, and Sasha inconvenienced by a bullet wound in the arm, he is still united to an utterly superfluous wife, and Sasha remains the spouse of Dr. Luke.

Cast

References

Bibliography
 Munden, Kenneth White. The American Film Institute Catalog of Motion Pictures Produced in the United States, Part 1. University of California Press, 1997.

External links

1924 films
1924 drama films
1920s English-language films
American silent feature films
Silent American drama films
American black-and-white films
Films directed by Victor Halperin
Associated Exhibitors films
1920s American films